Ebonshire - Volume 3 is the 23rd album released by Nox Arcana. It is the third in a series of winter holiday EPs inspired by Nox Arcana's holiday music trilogy: Winter's Knight (2005), Winter's Eve (2009), and Winter's Majesty (2012), which are each set in a fantasy realm called Ebonshire.

Composer Joseph Vargo explained that each year a new volume of songs is to be added to the Ebonshire series for the winter holiday season.
 The first track, "Echoes of Elise" is Vargo's rendition of Beethoven's "Für Elise."

Track listing
 Echoes of Elise — 3:34
 Silver Horizon — 3:26
 December's Child — 2:50
 Through Wintry Wilds — 2:42

References

External links 
 

Nox Arcana albums
2015 Christmas albums
Christmas EPs
Christmas albums by American artists
New-age Christmas albums